Ninjabread Man is a 2005 platform video game by developer and publisher Data Design Interactive. The game was released on the PlayStation 2 and Microsoft Windows in Europe in July 2005. A port for the Wii was released in September 2007 in Europe and Australia, and on October 3, 2007 in North America. Ninjabread Man was published as part of Data Design Interactive's 'Popcorn Arcade' brand of Wii games.

Upon release, Ninjabread Man received universally negative reviews from critics due to its camera system, graphics, lack of story, short length, and controls; the Wii version received even lower reviews for its use of motion controls and is often considered one of the worst games of all-time.

Gameplay

Ninjabread Man is an action-adventure platformer. There are three levels in the game, plus a tutorial level. In order to proceed to the next level, players must collect eight power rods to activate a teleporter. The Ninjabread Man can attack enemies directly with a samurai sword via a shake of the Wii Remote, as well as throw shurikens from a distance using the Wii Remote's IR functionality to aim. When the player completes a level and plays it again, a menu appears with a second mode available, ‘Score Pickups’. If the level is completed again in this mode, the player will unlock ‘Time Attack’ mode. Completion of this mode unlocks the ‘Hidden Pickups!’ mode, in which the player must find pickups.

Development 
Ninjabread Man reportedly started development as a planned third entry in the Zool series, a 2D platforming series released for the Amiga. Not much is actually known about the pitch, though it is believed that Zoo Digital Publishing (Zool's rights owners) weren't impressed by the tech demo and pulled the license. As such, DDI released the game as a standalone original game. Despite this, evidence for the game originally being a Zool game are still present; such as leftover Zool-themed levels themes and items, and a since leaked intro that shows Zool crashing onto a planet that closely resembles the one used in this game.

Reception

Ninjabread Man received unanimously negative reviews upon release. The PlayStation 2 version of the game has a 31% average rating on GameRankings, while the Wii version has an average of 17.5%. On Metacritic, the Wii version of the game has an average score of 20/100, based on 6 reviews. The PC version of the game was not reviewed by any major publication.

IGN gave the Wii version a score of 1.5/10, saying: "It’s buggy, often completely broken, somehow manages to have frame issues in tiny levels, and is completely ruthless if (and when) younger players die." Thunderbolt gave it 1/10, criticizing the game's length and the unimaginative use of the character as key flaws.

Legacy
On 23 January 2008, a sequel titled Ninjabread Man – Blades of Fury was announced. However, it was never released for unknown reasons and Data Design Interactive later went out of business in 2012.

See also
 Anubis II, Myth Makers: Trixie in Toyland and Rock 'n' Roll Adventures: three other games by Data Design Interactive which use the same engine

References

2005 video games
3D platform games
Data Design Interactive games
Video games about ninja
PlayStation 2 games
Video games about food and drink
Video games developed in the United Kingdom
Wii games
Windows games
RenderWare games
Conspiracy Entertainment games
Single-player video games
Metro3D games
Ninja characters in video games